Wen Xingyu (Chinese: 文兴宇; 1941–2007) was a popular comedian and director in mainland China. Wen is famous for his relaxing style and his talent as a senior comedian. He died on 30 July 2007 in Beijing due to lung cancer at the age of 65.

Biography and career 
 Born on 6 August 1941 in Dandong, Liaoning Province, China.
 Graduated from Beijing 101 Middle School and Central Academy of Drama.

Major works 
 The opera version of The True Story of Ah Q; I Love My Family; Home with Kids.

References 

1941 births
2007 deaths
Deaths from lung cancer
Chinese male stage actors
Male actors from Liaoning
Central Academy of Drama alumni
People from Dandong
Chinese male television actors
Chinese male comedians
20th-century Chinese male actors
21st-century Chinese male actors
20th-century comedians